Christopher Cerell Francies [FRAN-sis] (born July 26, 1982) is a former American football wide receiver. He was signed by the Green Bay Packers as an undrafted free agent in 2006. He played college football at Texas-El Paso. Francies is currently playing for the Utah Blaze of the Arena Football League

Francies previously played for the New Orleans Saints and San Francisco 49ers.

College career
Francies attended the University of Texas at El Paso and was a student Major in Biology and a letterman in football. In football, he was a four-year letterman and a three-year starter. As a senior, he won third-team All-Conference USA accolades and was named the team's Offensive M.V.P. and as a junior, he was an All-Western Athletic Conference Honorable Mention selection.

Professional career

Green Bay Packers
After playing two seasons with the Packers, Francies was released on August 25, 2008.

New Orleans Saints
Francies was signed to the practice squad of the New Orleans Saints on November 19, 2008.

San Francisco 49ers
Francies signed with the San Francisco 49ers on August 7, 2009. He was waived on August 30.

External links
UTEP Miners bio
Green Bay Packers bio
San Francisco 49ers bio

1982 births
Living people
Players of American football from Houston
American football wide receivers
UTEP Miners football players
Green Bay Packers players
New Orleans Saints players
San Francisco 49ers players
Utah Blaze players
Georgia Force players
Ed Block Courage Award recipients